"Gallery" is the debut single by artist Mario Vazquez, taken from his self-titled debut album. It was written by Ne-Yo and Stargate, who also produced the track whereas the former handled the song's vocal production. The song was one of the most added records at rhythmic radio stations across the United States in its first week of released, and was sent out to Top 40 radio on April 17, 2006. It was made available through all digital retailers as a single release on May 2, 2006, with both English and Spanglish (macaronic) versions of "Gallery" were released digitally and serviced to radio. The music video was released on May 30, 2006. The single managed to peak at number 35 on the Billboard Hot 100, but fared better on the Billboard Pop 100, peaking at number fifteen. It also peaked at number 42 on the Australian ARIA Top 100 and reached the top 15 in France.

Remixes were released featuring Baby Bash and Obie Trice. The Baby Bash version received a music video.

Charts

References

2006 debut singles
Mario Vazquez songs
Song recordings produced by Stargate (record producers)
Songs written by Ne-Yo
Songs written by Tor Erik Hermansen
Songs written by Mikkel Storleer Eriksen
2006 songs